Alex Buncombe (born 28 August 1981 in Taunton, England) is a British racing driver. He is a part of the Nismo Global Driver Exchange. He is the brother of Chris Buncombe.

Career
Buncombe competed in the British Formula Renault Championship from 2001 to 2003, finishing fifth in the 2003 Winter Series. He took part in his first GT race in 2005, competing in the Trofeo Maserati. He won his first race in the series, at Monza, by thirty-five seconds. From 2007 to 2011, Buncombe competed in the GT4 European Series for RJN Motorsport. He finished third in 2007 before finishing as runner-up in 2008 and 2009. He continued to drive in the series until 2011. In total he scored five pole positions and ten wins.

Buncombe has competed in the Blancpain Endurance Series since 2011, winning the GT4 Cup class that season along with Jordan Tresson and Christopher Ward. The GT4 Cup class was removed from the series the following year and Buncombe moved into the GT3 Pro-Am Cup class. Buncombe has scored two wins and recorded a best season finish of fourth in 2013.

Buncombe has taken part in various endurance races since 2008, including the Bathurst 12 Hour and the Dubai, Nürburgring, Silverstone and Spa 24 hour races.

Australia
Buncombe competed in the 2014 Bathurst 12 Hour as part of the Nismo Global Driver Exchange, driving a Nissan GT-R Nismo GT3 with Katsumasa Chiyo, Rick Kelly and Wolfgang Reip. Chiyo was involved in a crash in the early stages of the race, ending the team's chances after 58 laps. Buncombe was scheduled to return to the race for 2015, but was forced to withdraw due to the impending birth of his first child.

Following the 2014 Bathurst 12 Hour, Buncombe joined Nissan's V8 Supercar team as a co-driver for Todd Kelly in the 2014 Endurance Cup. The pair finished twentieth at the Sandown 500 before recording a creditable seventh-place finish at the Bathurst 1000.

Racing record

Career summary

FIA GT competition results

Complete FIA GT Series results

Complete Blancpain GT Series Sprint Cup results

Complete British GT Championship results

24 Hours of Le Mans results

Supercar results

Bathurst 1000 results

Britcar 24 Hour results

References

1981 births
Living people
Sportspeople from Taunton
24 Hours of Le Mans drivers
English racing drivers
British Formula Renault 2.0 drivers
FIA GT Championship drivers
Supercars Championship drivers
24 Hours of Spa drivers
Blancpain Endurance Series drivers
Britcar 24-hour drivers
Nismo drivers
FIA World Endurance Championship drivers
Greaves Motorsport drivers
Kelly Racing drivers
KCMG drivers
Nürburgring 24 Hours drivers
GT4 European Series drivers
M-Sport drivers